Klostermann is a German surname. Notable people with the surname include:

August Klostermann (1837–1915), German theologian
Karel Klostermann (1848–1923), Czech and Austrian writer
Lukas Klostermann (born 1996), German footballer

See also
Closterman
Pierre Clostermann (1921–2006), World War II French fighter pilot
Kloosterman

German-language surnames

de:Clostermann